Nikita Sergeyevich Mikhalkov (born 21 October 1945) is a Soviet and Russian filmmaker, actor, and head of the Russian Cinematographers' Union. Mikhalkov is a three-time laureate of the State Prize of the Russian Federation (1993, 1995, 1999) and is a Full Cavalier of the Order "For Merit to the Fatherland".

Nikita Mikhalkov won the Golden Lion of the Venice Film Festival (1991) and was nominated for the Academy Award (1993) in the category Best International Feature Film for the film Close to Eden. He won an Academy Award (1995) for Best Foreign Language Film and the Grand Prix of the Cannes Film Festival (1994) for the film Burnt by the Sun. Mikhalkov received the "Special Lion" of the Venice Film Festival (2007) for his contribution to the cinematography and nominated for an Academy Award for the film 12 (2007). In January 2023, Ukraine imposed sanctions on Nikita for his support of 2022 Russian invasion of Ukraine.

Ancestry

Mikhalkov was born in Moscow into the distinguished, artistic Mikhalkov family. His great grandfather was the imperial governor of Yaroslavl, whose mother was a princess of the House of Golitsyn. Nikita's father, Sergey Mikhalkov, was best known as writer of children's literature, although he also wrote lyrics to his country's national anthem on three occasions spanning nearly 60 years – two sets of lyrics used for the Soviet national anthem, and the current lyrics of the Russian national anthem. Mikhalkov's mother, poet Natalia Konchalovskaya, was the daughter of the avant-garde artist Pyotr Konchalovsky and granddaughter of another outstanding painter, Vasily Surikov. Nikita's older brother is the filmmaker Andrei Konchalovsky, primarily known for his collaboration with Andrei Tarkovsky and his own Hollywood action films, such as Runaway Train and Tango & Cash.

Career

Early acting career
Mikhalkov studied acting at the children's studio of the Moscow Art Theatre and later at the Shchukin School of the Vakhtangov Theatre. While still a student, he appeared in Georgiy Daneliya's film Walking the Streets of Moscow (1964) and his brother Andrei Konchalovsky's film Home of the Gentry (1969). He was soon on his way to becoming a star of the Soviet stage and cinema.

Directing
While continuing to pursue his acting career, he entered VGIK, the state film school in Moscow, where he studied directing under filmmaker Mikhail Romm, teacher to his brother and Andrei Tarkovsky. He directed his first short film in 1968, I'm Coming Home, and another for his graduation, A Quiet Day at the End of the War in 1970. Mikhalkov had appeared in more than 20 films, including his brother's Uncle Vanya (1972), before he co-wrote, directed and starred in his first feature, At Home Among Strangers in 1974, an Ostern set just after the 1920s civil war in Russia.

Mikhalkov established an international reputation with his second feature, A Slave of Love (1976). Set in 1917, it followed the efforts of a film crew to make a silent melodrama in a resort town while the Revolution rages around them. The film, based upon the last days of Vera Kholodnaya, was highly acclaimed upon its release in the U.S.

Mikhalkov's next film, An Unfinished Piece for Mechanical Piano (1977) was adapted by Mikhalkov from Chekhov's early play, Platonov, and won the first prize at the San Sebastián International Film Festival. In 1978, while starring in his brother's epic film Siberiade, Mikhalkov made Five Evenings, a love story about a couple separated by World War II, who meet again after eighteen years. Mikhalkov's next film, A Few Days from the Life of I. I. Oblomov (1980), with Oleg Tabakov in the title role, is based on Ivan Goncharov's classic novel about a lazy young nobleman who refuses to leave his bed. Family Relations (1981) is a comedy about a provincial woman in Moscow dealing with the tangled relationships of her relatives. Without Witness (1983) tracks a long night's conversation between a woman (Irina Kupchenko) and her ex-husband (Mikhail Ulyanov) when they are accidentally locked in a room. The film won the Prix FIPRESCI at the 13th Moscow International Film Festival.

In the early 1980s, Mikhalkov resumed his acting career, appearing in Eldar Ryazanov's immensely popular Station for Two (1982) and A Cruel Romance (1984). At that period, he also played Henry Baskerville in the Soviet screen version of The Hound of the Baskervilles. He also starred in many of his own films, including At Home Among Strangers, A Slave of Love, and An Unfinished Piece for Player Piano.

International success
Incorporating several short stories by Chekhov, Dark Eyes (1987) stars Marcello Mastroianni as an old man who tells a story of a romance he had when he was younger, a woman he has never been able to forget. The film was highly praised, and Mastroianni received the Best Actor Prize at the 1987 Cannes Film Festival and an Academy Award nomination for his performance.

Mikhalkov's next film, Urga (1992, a.k.a. Close to Eden), set in the little-known world of the Mongols, received the Golden Lion at the Venice Film Festival and was nominated for the Academy Award for Best Foreign Language Film. Mikhalkov's Anna: 6–18 (1993) documents his daughter Anna as she grows from childhood to maturity.

Mikhalkov's most famous production to date, Burnt by the Sun (1994), was steeped in the paranoid atmosphere of Joseph Stalin's Great Terror. The film received the Grand Prize at Cannes and the Academy Award for Best International Feature Film, among many other honors. To date, Burnt by the Sun remains the highest-grossing film to come out of the former Soviet Union.

In 1996, he was the head of the jury at the 46th Berlin International Film Festival.

Recent career

 
Mikhalkov used the critical and financial triumph of Burnt by the Sun to raise $25 million for his most epic venture to date, The Barber of Siberia (1998). The film, which was screened out of competition at the 1999 Cannes Film Festival, was designed as a patriotic extravaganza for domestic consumption. It featured Julia Ormond and Oleg Menshikov, who regularly appears in Mikhalkov's films, in the leading roles. The director himself appeared as Tsar Alexander III of Russia.

The film received the Russian State Prize and spawned rumours about Mikhalkov's presidential ambitions. The director, however, chose to administer the Russian cinema industry. Despite much opposition from rival directors, he was elected the President of the Russian Society of Cinematographers and has managed the Moscow Film Festival since 2000. He also set the Russian Academy Golden Eagle Award in opposition to the traditional Nika Award.

In 2005, Mikhalkov resumed his acting career, starring in three brand-new movies – The Councillor of State, a Fandorin mystery film which broke the Russian box-office records, Dead Man's Bluff, a noir-drenched comedy about the Russian Mafia, and Krzysztof Zanussi's Persona non grata.

In 2007, Mikhalkov directed and starred in 12, a Russian adaptation of Sidney Lumet's court drama 12 Angry Men. In September 2007, 12 received a special Golden Lion for the “consistent brilliance” of its work and was praised by many critics at the Venice Film Festival. In 2008, 12 was named as a nominee for Best Foreign Language Film for the 80th Academy Awards. Commenting on the nomination, Mikhalkov said, "I am overjoyed that the movie has been noticed in the United States and, what's more, was included in the shortlist of five nominees. This is a significant event for me."

He also served as the executive producer of an epic film 1612.

Mikhalkov presented his "epic drama" Burnt by the Sun 2 at the 2010 Cannes Film Festival, but did not receive any awards. The film was selected in 2011 as the Russian entry for the Best International Feature Film at the 84th Academy Awards.

Personal life
Mikhalkov's first wife was renowned Russian actress Anastasiya Vertinskaya, whom he married on 6 March 1967. They had a son, Stepan (born September 1966).

With his second wife, former model Tatyana, he had a son Artyom (born 8 December 1975), and daughters Anna (born 1974) and Nadya (born 27 September 1986).

Political activity

Mikhalkov is actively involved in Russian politics. He is known for his at times Russian nationalist and Slavophile views. Mikhalkov was instrumental in propagating Ivan Ilyin's ideas in post-Soviet Russia. He authored several articles about Ilyin and came up with the idea of transferring his remains from Switzerland to the Donskoy Monastery in Moscow, where the philosopher had dreamed to find his last retreat. The ceremony of reburial, also of Anton Denikin, a general whose slogan was ‘Russia, one and indivisible’ was held on 3 October 2005. 

In October 2006, Mikhalkov visited Serbia, giving moral support to Serbia's sovereignty over Kosovo. In 2008, he visited Serbia to support Tomislav Nikolić who was running as the ultra-nationalist candidate for the Serb presidency at the time. Mikhalkov took part in a meeting of "Nomocanon", a Serb youth organization which denies war crimes committed by Serbs in the 1992–99 Yugoslav Wars. In a speech given to the organization, Mikhalkov spoke about a "war against Orthodoxy" wherein he cited Orthodox Christianity as "the main force which opposes cultural and intellectual McDonald's". In response to his statement, a journalist asked Mikhalkov: "Which is better, McDonald's or Stalinism?" Mikhalkov answered: "That depends on the person". Mikhalkov has described himself as a monarchist.

Mikhalkov has been a strong supporter of Russian president Vladimir Putin. In October 2007, Mikhalkov, who produced a television program for Putin's 55th birthday, co-signed an open letter asking Putin not to step down after the expiry of his term in office.

Mikhalkov's vertical of power-style leadership of the Cinematographers' Union has been criticized by many prominent Russian filmmakers and critics as autocratic, and encouraged many members to leave and form a rival union in April 2010.

In 2015, Mikhalkov was banned from entering Ukraine for 5 years because of his support for the 2014 Russian annexation of Crimea. Despite his support for the annexation of Crimea he also called for the release of imprisoned Ukrainian filmmaker Oleg Sentsov.

On February 24, 2022, he advocated the international recognition of the Donetsk People's Republic and the Luhansk People's Republic by Russia and supported 2022 Russian invasion of Ukraine, citing betrayal by Ukraine and the killings of Donbas residents. He also criticized those Russian cultural figures who oppose Russia's invasion, arguing that they were silent about the crimes against Donbas, and now, in his opinion, they are only saving their property abroad from sanctions and teaching their children there.

In December 2022 the EU sanctioned Mikhalkov in relation to the 2022 Russian invasion of Ukraine. In January 2023 Ukraine also imposed sanctions related to the invasion.

Honours and awards

 Hero of Labour of the Russian Federation (21 October 2020)
Honored Artist of the RSFSR (1976)
 People's Artist of the RSFSR (1984)
 Order "For Merit to the Fatherland";
1st class (29 June 2015) 
2nd class (21 October 2005) – for outstanding contribution to the development of national culture and art, and many years of creative activity
3rd class (17 October 1995) – for services to the state, a great contribution to the development of motion picture arts and culture
4th class (21 October 2010) – for outstanding contribution to the development of the domestic art of film, many years of creative and social activities
 Knight Grand Cross of the Order of Merit of the Italian Republic (2004)
 Commander of the Legion of Honour (1994), previously Officer (1992)
 Order of St. Sergius, 1st class (Russian Orthodox Church)
 Honorary Member of Russian Academy of Arts
 Lenin Komsomol Prize (1978)
 State Prize of the Russian Federation (1993, 1995 and 1999)

Filmography

As director

 Devochka i veshchi (1967) (short film)
 And this lips, and green eyes… (1967) (short film)
 And I Go Home (1968) (short film)
 A Quiet Day During the End of War (1970) (short film)
 At Home Among Strangers (1974)
 A Slave of Love (1976)
 An Unfinished Piece for Mechanical Piano (1977)
 Five Evenings (1978)
 A Few Days from the Life of I.I. Oblomov (1980)
 Family Relations (1981)
 Without Witness (1983)
 Dark Eyes (1987)
 Hitch-hiking (1990)
 Close to Eden (1992) (aka Urga)
 Remembering Chekhov (1993)
 Anna: 6 - 18 (1993)
 Burnt by the Sun (1994)
 The Barber of Siberia (1998)
 12 (2007)
 Burnt by the Sun 2: Exodus (2010)
 Burnt by the Sun 2: The Citadel (2011)
 Sunstroke (2014)

As actor (selected) – (with director) 

 Adventures of Krosh (1961) – Genrikh Oganisyan
 I Step Through Moscow (1964) – Georgiy Daneliya
 A Nest of Gentry (1965) – Andrei Konchalovsky
 The Red and the White (1967) - Miklós Jancsó
 The Red Tent (1969) – Mikhail Kalatozov
 The Stationmaster (1972) – Sergei Solovyov
 At Home Among Strangers (1974) – Himself
 A Slave of Love (1976) – Himself
 An Unfinished Piece for a Player Piano (1977) – Himself
 Siberiade (1978) – Andrei Konchalovsky
 The Hound of the Baskervilles (1981) – Igor Maslennikov
 A Painter's Wife Portrait (1982) – 
 Station for Two (1983) – Eldar Ryazanov
 A Cruel Romance (1984) – Eldar Ryazanov
  (1991) – Andrei Andreyevich Eshpai
 Burnt by the Sun (1994) – Himself
 Gogol's The Government Inspector (1996) – 
 The Barber of Siberia (1998) – Himself
 The State Counsellor (2005) – Filipp Yankovsky
 Zhmurki (2005) – Aleksei Balabanov
 Persona Non Grata (2005) – Krzysztof Zanussi
 12 (2007) – Himself
 Burnt by the Sun 2: Exodus (2010) - Himself
 Burnt by the Sun 3: The Citadel (2011) - Himself

References

External links

Mikhalkov Productions

Russian director Mikhalkov's "12" movie nominated for Oscar

1945 births
20th-century Russian male actors
20th-century Russian politicians
21st-century Russian male actors
21st-century Russian politicians
Living people
Academicians of the National Academy of Motion Picture Arts and Sciences of Russia
Gerasimov Institute of Cinematography alumni
Academic staff of High Courses for Scriptwriters and Film Directors
Honorary Members of the Russian Academy of Arts
Male actors from Moscow
Honored Artists of the RSFSR
People's Artists of the RSFSR
Recipients of the Lenin Komsomol Prize
Recipients of the Nika Award
Full Cavaliers of the Order "For Merit to the Fatherland"
Commandeurs of the Légion d'honneur
Knights Grand Cross of the Order of Merit of the Italian Republic
Officiers of the Légion d'honneur
State Prize of the Russian Federation laureates
Russian film directors
Russian Orthodox Christians from Russia
Russian monarchists
Soviet male film actors
Soviet film directors
Our Home – Russia politicians
Directors of Best Foreign Language Film Academy Award winners
Directors of Golden Lion winners
Russian YouTubers
Mikhalkov family
Anti-Ukrainian sentiment in Russia
Ciak d'oro winners